Clay County is a county in the U.S. state of South Dakota. As of the 2020 United States Census, the population was 14,967. The county seat is Vermillion, which is also home to the University of South Dakota. The county is named for Henry Clay, American statesman, US Senator from Kentucky, and United States Secretary of State in the 19th century.

Clay County comprises the Vermillion, SD Micropolitan Statistical Area, which is also included in the Sioux City-Vermillion, IA-SD-NE Combined Statistical Area.

History
The future Clay County area was opened for legal settlement in 1859. In Autumn 1859, Ahira A. Partridge (who would become the first elected sheriff of the county) crossed the Missouri river into the Dakota territory, and became the first white man to settle, on 160 acres of land that now underlies Vermillion. In 1862 the county was formally organized. The Clay County Courthouse was built in 1912.

Clay County is the name of 17 other counties in the United States, most of them named for Henry Clay.

Geography
Clay County lies on the south line of South Dakota. The south boundary line of Clay County abuts the north line of the state of Nebraska (across the Missouri River). The Missouri River flows southeast along the south boundary line of Clay County. A small drainage creek flows into the county from Turner County, draining the central and eastern portions of the county and discharging into the river. Smaller drainages move water from the western county areas into the river. In addition to sloping into the drainage through the center of the county, the terrain generally slopes to the south. The area is largely devoted to agriculture.

It is the smallest county by area in South Dakota.

Adjacent counties

 Turner County - north
 Lincoln County - northeast
 Union County - east
 Dixon County, Nebraska - southeast
 Cedar County, Nebraska - southwest
 Yankton County - west

Major highways
  South Dakota Highway 19
  South Dakota Highway 46
  South Dakota Highway 50

Protected areas
 Missouri National Recreational River (part)
 Spirit Mound State Historic Prairie

Demographics

2000 census
As of the 2000 United States Census, there were 13,537 people, 4,878 households, and 2,721 families in the county. The population density was 33 people per square mile (13/km2). There were 5,438 housing units at an average density of 13 per square mile (5/km2).

There were 4,878 households, out of which 28.00% had children under the age of 18 living with them, 45.00% were married couples living together, 8.10% had a female householder with no husband present, and 44.20% were non-families. 31.00% of all households were made up of individuals, and 8.00% had someone living alone who was 65 years of age or older. The average household size was 2.32 and the average family size was 2.93.

The county population contained 18.80% under the age of 18, 31.50% from 18 to 24, 23.80% from 25 to 44, 15.80% from 45 to 64, and 10.10% who were 65 years of age or older. The median age was 25 years. For every 100 females, there were 94.30 males. For every 100 females age 18 and over, there were 92.50 males.

2010 census
As of the 2010 census, there were 13,864 people, 5,110 households, and 2,628 families in the county. The racial makeup of the county was 91.1% White, 3.1% American Indian, 1.7% Asian, 1.3% black or African American, 0.5% from other races, and 2.3% from two or more races. Those of Hispanic or Latino origin made up 2.0% of the population. In terms of ancestry, 43.9% were German, 16.4% were Norwegian, 15.8% were Irish, 8.7% were English, 5.4% were Swedish, and 1.8% were American.

Of the 5,110 households, 24.7% had children under the age of 18 living with them, 40.9% were married couples living together, 7.3% had a female householder with no husband present, 48.6% were non-families, and 32.4% of all households were made up of individuals. The average household size was 2.28 and the average family size was 2.91. The median age was 25.0 years.

The median income for a household in the county was $37,198 and the median income for a family was $61,159. Males had a median income of $37,059 versus $28,016 for females. The per capita income for the county was $19,518. About 8.0% of families and 24.0% of the population were below the poverty line, including 13.6% of those under age 18 and 6.7% of those age 65 or over.

Racial/ethnic makeup
The racial makeup of the county was 92.78% White, 1.00% Black or African American, 2.66% Native American, 1.95% Asian, 0.01% Pacific Islander, 0.29% from other races, and 1.31% from two or more races. 0.89% of the population were Hispanic or Latino of any race. 32.0% were of German, 15.6% Norwegian, 9.9% Irish and 5.4% English ancestry.

Religion
From 2000 Census data, over 50% consider themselves "unclaimed".
Mainline Protestant with 3,840 is most common around 28%; mainly Lutheran;
Catholic with 1820 comes second around 13%;
Evangelical Protestant with 613 would be around 5%; mainly Lutheran Church–Missouri Synod and Southern Baptist.

Education
 University of South Dakota -  In 1862 the territorial legislature located the State University in Vermillion, but nothing was done until 1882 when Clay County voted $10,000 in bonds to construct a building on its campus.

Communities

Cities
Irene (partial)
Vermillion (county seat)

Town
Wakonda

Census-designated places 

 Burbank

 Meckling

Unincorporated communities

 Alsen (partial)
 Dalesburg
 Greenfield
 Hub City
 Westreville

Townships

Bethel
Fairview
Garfield
Glenwood
Meckling
Norway
Pleasant Valley
Prairie Center
Riverside
Spirit Mound
Star
Vermillion

Politics
Largely due to the presence of the University of South Dakota, Clay County has consistently voted for Democratic Party candidates for president from 1988 onward, frequently by double digit margins. In 2000, 2016, and 2020, it was the only county in South Dakota without a Native American majority to vote Democratic for president.

See also

National Register of Historic Places listings in Clay County, South Dakota

References

External links

 Clay County, SD
 Clay County, Historical Society
 South Dakota Association of County Officials

 
South Dakota counties on the Missouri River
1862 establishments in Dakota Territory
Populated places established in 1862
Micropolitan areas of South Dakota